Anton Sergeyevich Kotkov (born 20 April 1990, Petrozavodsk), is a Russian taekwondo athlete. He won the silver medal at the 2017 World Taekwondo Championships on the welterweight category and the bronze medal at the 2013 World Taekwondo Championships in the welterweight category.

References 

Living people
People from Petrozavodsk
Russian male taekwondo practitioners
1990 births
World Taekwondo Championships medalists
21st-century Russian people